Go and Ask Peggy for the Principal Thing is the fourth album by German rock band Fool's Garden, released in 1997. It contains a cover of the Beatles' song "Martha My Dear".

Track listing
 "The Principal Thing"
 "Emily"
 "Why Did She Go?"
 "Why Am I Sad Today"
 "Martha My Dear" (Lennon–McCartney)
 "And You Say"
 "Probably"
 "Nothing"
 "When The Moon Kisses Town"
 "Rainy Day"
 "Northern Town"
 "Good Night"
 "Probably" (reprise) - hidden track

Musicians
Peter Freudenthaler - vocals
Volker Hinkel - guitars, mandolin, blues harp, keyboards and backing vocals
Roland Röhl - keyboards, accordion and backing vocals
Thomas Mangold - bass, double bass and backing vocals
Ralf Wochele - drums and backing vocals
Oliver Frager - trumpet and French horn
Bob Perry - trombone and tuba
Gitte Haus - backing vocals
Jette Schniering - cello
Oliver Maguire - weatherforecast on "Rainy Day"

Singles
"Why Did She Go?"
"Probably"
"Rainy Day"

1997 albums
Fools Garden albums
Intercord albums